The Belleville Bulls were a junior ice hockey team, founded in 1981 and based in Belleville, Ontario, Canada. The team played in the Eastern Division of the Eastern Conference of the Ontario Hockey League. The team moved to Hamilton, Ontario at the end of the 2014–15 OHL season.

History
The Belleville Bulls started in 1979 as a Junior Tier II team in the OHA. In their second season in 1980–81, the Bulls won the Tier II title, defeating the Guelph Platers in the league finals. The Bulls then competed in the national championship for the Manitoba Centennial Trophy hosted in Halifax, Nova Scotia losing in the finals to the Prince Albert Raiders.

On February 2, 1981, the OHL granted an expansion franchise to the city of Belleville and the ownership group of Dr. Robert L. Vaughan & Bob Dolan. Dr. Robert L. Vaughan remained an owner/co-owner of the team for over 20 years until he sold the team in 2004 to Gord Simmonds. Dr. Vaughan was awarded the Bill Long award in 1993 for distinguished service to the OHL.

In 1983, Belleville hosted the OHL All-Star Game, known then as the OHL Chrysler Cup.

The Bulls reached the OHL finals in 1986 versus a familiar foe from their Tier II days, the Guelph Platers. The Platers won the series in 6 games. In 1995 and 1996, the Bulls lost in the semi-finals to the Guelph Storm.

The 1999 season would be one for the memories when the Belleville Bulls would win it all. The Bulls defeated the London Knights 9–2 in game seven of the OHL championship series at the Yardmen Arena to win their first J. Ross Robertson Cup.

The Bulls competed in the 1999 Memorial Cup, hosted in Ottawa versus the Calgary Hitmen, Acadie-Bathurst Titan & Ottawa 67's. Belleville finished 3rd, losing to Ottawa 4–2 in the semifinal.

In the 2005–06 season, the Belleville Bulls celebrated their 25th anniversary in the OHL. The team also hosted the annual OHL All-Star game for the second time, on February 1, 2006. The Bulls set a season-best record of 102 points earned during the 2007–08 regular season.

In 2007–08, the Bulls made a trip to the Memorial Cup by virtue of Kitchener winning the Western Conference, and being the host, Belleville would get in as the OHL representative. The Bulls would lose the semi-final game 9-0 against the hosting team, the Kitchener Rangers, who would eventually lose to the Spokane Chiefs in the championship game.

On March 12, 2015, Michael Andlauer announced that he had acquired the Belleville Bulls, and that they would move to Hamilton's FirstOntario Centre for the 2015-16 season to become the Hamilton Bulldogs. The Hamilton Bulldogs, an American Hockey League franchise, was concurrently sold to the Montreal Canadiens and moved to St. John's, Newfoundland for the 2015-16 season as the St. John's IceCaps (the True North Sports and Entertainment-owned IceCaps, which was affiliated with the Winnipeg Jets, moved back to Winnipeg as the Manitoba Moose).

Championships

Leyden Trophy East Division Regular Season Champions
2000–2001
2001–2002
2006–2007
2007–2008
2008–2009
2012–2013

Bobby Orr Trophy Eastern Conference Champions
1998–1999
2007–2008

J. Ross Robertson Cup Championships: 1999
1985–1986 — Lost to Guelph Platers in OHL Final
1998–1999 — OHL Champions vs. London Knights
2007-2008 —Lost to Kitchener Rangers in OHL Final
Memorial Cup Appearances: 2
1999 OHL representative in Ottawa, Ontario
2008 OHL representative in Kitchener, Ontario

Coaches
Larry Mavety coached the Belleville Bulls for 14 seasons. He is third only to Brian Kilrea & Dale Hunter for amount of time coached with an OHL team

Lou Crawford was groomed by Mavety to replace him behind the Bulls' bench. Lou Crawford is the brother of NHL Coach Marc Crawford, who was also the coach of the St. John's Maple Leafs (now the Toronto Marlies) in the AHL, which played in St. John's, Newfoundland and Labrador. Their father, Floyd Crawford, was team captain of the 1959 World Champion Belleville McFarlands.

Former coaches Lou Crawford and Shawn MacKenzie both had brief NHL careers. George Burnett briefly coached with the Edmonton Oilers. James Boyd is the only former Bulls player to later coach the Belleville team.

List of Coaches
(Multiple years in parentheses)

Players

Award winners

Captains

Retired numbers
# 15 — Dunc MacIntyre

NHL alumni

Steve Bancroft
Matt Beleskey
Radim Bicanek
Craig Billington
Evan Brophey
Kevin Brown
Sean Brown
Brian Chapman
Jonathan Cheechoo
Tony Cimellaro
David Clarkson
Daniel Cleary
Brandon Convery
Craig Coxe
Troy Crowder
Andre Deveaux
Doug Doull
Stan Drulia
Brendan Gaunce
Doug Gilmour
Tyler Graovac
Dan Gratton
Brent Gretzky
Philipp Grubauer
David Haas
Mike Hartman
Todd Hawkins
Bryan Helmer
Al Iafrate
Jason Lafreniere
Shawn Lalonde
Kevin MacDonald
Bryan Marchment
Brandon Mashinter
Shawn Matthias
Darren McCarty
Cody McCormick
Chris McRae
Marty McSorley
Branislav Mezei
Craig Mills
Mike Murphy
Jan Mursak
Kris Newbury
Nick Palmieri
Darren Pang
Richard Panik
Justin Papineau
Richard Park
Adam Payerl
Rob Pearson
Matt Pelech
John Purves
Alan Quine
Dan Quinn
Branko Radivojevic
Ryan Ready
Keith Redmond
Nathan Robinson
Jarrod Skalde
Jason Spezza
Matt Stajan
Malcolm Subban
P. K. Subban
Eric Tangradi
Scott Thornton
Nikos Tselios
Mike Vellucci
Kyle Wellwood
Derek Wilkinson
Darryl Williams

Source

Season-by-season results

Regular season
Legend: OL = Overtime loss, SL = Shootout Loss

Playoffs
1979–1980 Lost to Aurora Tigers 4 games to 3 in quarter-final.
1980–1981 Defeated Markham Waxers 4 games to 1 in quarter-final. Defeated North Bay Trappers 4 games to 0 in semi-final Defeated Guelph Platers 4 games to 1 in final to win OPJHL Championship Defeated Onaping Falls Huskies (NOJHL) for OHA Championship 3 games to 0. Defeated Thunder Bay Kings (TBJHL) 4 games to 1 in Central Canada semi-final Defeated Gloucester Rangers (CJHL) 4 games to 3 in Central Canada final to win Dudley Hewitt Cup Finished 2nd in Centennial Cup Round Robin. Lost National final 6-2 to Prince Albert Raiders (SJHL).
1981–1982 Out of playoffs.
1982–1983 Lost to Oshawa Generals 7 points to 1 in first round.
1983–1984 Lost to Oshawa Generals 6 points to 0 in first round.
1984–1985 Defeated Oshawa Generals 8 points to 2 in first round. Defeated Cornwall Royals 6 points to 2 in quarter-finals. Lost to Peterborough Petes 9 points to 1 in semi-finals.
1985–1986 Defeated Cornwall Royals 9 points to 3 in first round. Tied for first in round robin with Peterborough Petes versus Kingston Canadians. Defeated Peterborough Petes 9 points to 7 in semi-finals. Lost to Guelph Platers 8 points to 4 in finals.
1986–1987 Lost to Kingston Canadians 4 games to 2 in first round.
1987–1988 Lost to Cornwall Royals 4 games to 2 in first round.
1988–1989 Lost to Peterborough Petes 4 games to 1 in first round.
1989–1990 Defeated Kingston Frontenacs 4 games to 3 in first round. Lost to Peterborough Petes 4 games to 0 in quarter-finals.
1990–1991 Lost to Ottawa 67's 4 games to 2 in first round.
1991–1992 Lost to North Bay Centennials 4 games to 1 in first round.
1992–1993 Lost to Oshawa Generals 4 games to 3 in first round.
1993–1994 Defeated Kingston Frontenacs 4 games to 2 in division quarter-finals. Lost to North Bay Centennials 4 games to 2 in division semi-finals.
1994–1995 Defeated North Bay Centennials 4 games to 2 in division quarter-finals. Defeated Kingston Frontenacs 4 games to 2 in quarter-finals. Lost to Guelph Storm 4 games to 0 in semi-finals.
1995–1996 Defeated Oshawa Generals 4 games to 1 in division quarter-finals. Defeated Ottawa 67's 4 games to 0 in quarter-finals. Lost to Guelph Storm 4 games to 1 in semi-finals.
1996–1997 Lost to Ottawa 67's 4 games to 2 in division quarter-finals.
1997–1998 Defeated Peterborough Petes 4 games to 0 in division quarter-finals. Lost to Plymouth Whalers 4 games to 2 in quarter-finals.
1998–1999 Defeated Sudbury Wolves 4 games to 0 in conference quarter-finals. Defeated Ottawa 67's 4 games to 1 in conference semi-finals. Defeated Oshawa Generals 4 games to 1 in conference finals. Defeated London Knights 4 games to 3 in finals. OHL CHAMPIONS. Finished 3rd in Memorial Cup round-robin. Lost to Ottawa 67's in semi-finals.
1999–2000 Defeated Peterborough Petes 4 games to 1 in conference quarter-finals. Defeated Ottawa 67's 4 games to 2 in conference semi-finals. Lost to Barrie Colts 4 games to 1 in conference finals.
2000–2001 Defeated Kingston Frontenacs 4 games to 0 in conference quarter-finals. Lost to Ottawa 67's 4 games to 2 in conference semi-finals.
2001–2002 Defeated Oshawa Generals 4 games to 1 in conference quarter-finals. Lost to Barrie Colts 4 games to 2 in conference semi-finals.
2002–2003 Lost to Toronto St. Michael's Majors 4 games to 3 in conference quarter-finals.
2003–2004 Out of playoffs.
2004–2005 Lost to Peterborough Petes 4 games to 1 in conference quarter-finals.
2005–2006 Lost to Brampton Battalion 4 games to 2 in conference quarter-finals.
2006–2007 Defeated Ottawa 67's 4 games to 1 in conference quarter-finals. Defeated Oshawa Generals 4 games to 0 in conference semi-finals.Lost to Sudbury Wolves 4 games to 2 in conference finals.
2007–2008 Defeated Peterborough Petes 4 games to 1 in conference quarter-finals. Defeated Barrie Colts 4 games to 0 in conference semi-finals. Defeated Oshawa Generals 4 games to 1 in conference finals.  Lost to Kitchener Rangers 4 games to 3 in Finals. Finished 2nd in Memorial Cup round-robin. Lost to Kitchener Rangers in semi-finals.
2008–2009 Defeated Sudbury Wolves 4 games to 2 in conference quarter-finals. Defeated Niagara Ice Dogs 4 games to 1 in conference semi-finals. Lost to Brampton Battalion 4 games to 2 in conference finals.
2009–2010 Out of playoffs.
2010–2011 Lost to Mississauga St. Michael's Majors 4 games to 0 in conference quarter-finals.
2011–2012 Lost to Ottawa 67's 4 games to 2 in conference quarter-finals.
2012–2013 Defeated Mississauga Steelheads 4 games to 2 in conference quarter-finals. Defeated Sudbury Wolves 4 games to 0 in conference semi-finals. Lost to Barrie Colts 4 games to 3 in conference finals.
2013–2014 Out of playoffs.
2014–2015 Lost to Barrie Colts 4 games to 0 in conference quarter-finals.

Uniforms and logos

1999 to present:
Uniform Colours: Black, Red, Gold, White
Logo Design: An angry bull with a hockey stick

1982 to 1998:
Uniform Colours: Black, Red, Gold, White
Logo Design: A standing red and orange bull

Bulls Uniforms

Arena
The team has played all homes games at the Belleville Yardmen Arena (capacity 3,257) for the existence of the franchise. The Yardmen Arena is part of the Quinte Sports Centre which is composed of the Yardmen Arena and the Wally Dever arena which is home to the Belleville McFarlands, an OHA Senior team, and is also used by minor hockey teams.

 Capacity = 3,257
 Ice Size = 199.5' x 99.5'

See also
List of ice hockey teams in Ontario

References

Ice hockey clubs established in 1981
Ice hockey clubs disestablished in 2015
Ontario Hockey League teams
Sport in Belleville, Ontario
1981 establishments in Ontario
2015 disestablishments in Ontario